The Looney Mill Creek Site is a prehistoric and historic archaeological site near Buchanan in Botetourt County, Virginia.  The site, located near the confluence of Looney's Mill Creek and the James River, has evidence of Native American occupation dating as far back as 6000BC, and was the site of the settlement and mill established c. 1742 by Robert Looney, one of the area's first European settlers.

The site was listed on the National Register of Historic Places in 1978.

See also
National Register of Historic Places listings in Botetourt County, Virginia

References

National Register of Historic Places in Botetourt County, Virginia
Archaeological sites on the National Register of Historic Places in Virginia